The 1838 Vermont gubernatorial election was held on September 4, 1838.

Incumbent Whig Governor Silas H. Jennison defeated Democratic nominee William Czar Bradley with 56.26% of the vote.

General election

Candidates
William Czar Bradley, Democratic, former U.S. Representative, Democratic candidate for Governor in 1834, 1835, 1836 and 1837
Silas H. Jennison, Whig, incumbent Governor

Results

Notes

References

1838
Vermont
Gubernatorial